Fu Jow Pai (Cantonese Jyutping: Fu2 Zaau2 Pai3, Mandarin , literally "Tiger Claw School", also "Tiger Claw System" or "Tiger Claw Style"), originally named "Hark Fu Moon" (Cantonese Jyutping: Hak1 Fu2 Mun4, Mandarin , literally "Black Tiger School", also "Black Tiger System"), is a Chinese martial art that has its origins in Hoy Hong Temple out of Tiger techniques of Five Animal Kung Fu, Ng Ying Kungfu (Chinese: 五形功夫). The system "was modeled after the demeanor and fighting strategy of an attacking tiger. Techniques unique to Fu-Jow Pai are ripping, tearing, clawing and grasping applications."

Influences 

Fu Jow Pai Grand Masters trained in the following additional styles:
 Wong Bil Hong mastered Hung Gar under Wong Kei-Ying and his son, Wong Fei-Hung.
 Wong Moon Toy mastered Hung Gar under Lam Sai Wing + Wong Bil Hong and Mizongyi under Lau Chook Fung and Doon Yuk Ching before training in Hark Fu Moon with his uncle, Wong Bil Hong.
 Wai Hong also learned (most notably) Hung Gar, Mizongyi, Choy Lee Fut, and T'ai chi ch'uan.

Contributions 

In 1971, Wai Hong sponsored the first all open style full-contact kung fu tournament in the US and which became the model for future US full-contact tournaments. He also founded the Eastern United States Kung-Fu Federation, which he led for eight years. Fu-Jow Pai has appeared in multiple movies, documentaries, and tournaments.

See also
 Chin Na
 Shuai Jiao
 Heihuquan

References

Further reading 
 
 

Chinese martial arts
Games and sports introduced in 1934